Kadoo Sara (also Romanized as Kooee Sarā, khashe kooee Sara, and halva kooee-Sara; also known as  خاش کویی سرا ) is a village in Sangar Rural District, Sangar District, Rasht County, Gilan Province, Iran. At the 2006 census, its population was 1,241, in 369 families.

References 

Populated places in Rasht County